Murat Kaya (born June 13, 1984) is a Turkish professional basketball player. He currently plays with Rönesans TED Ankara Kolejliler.

External links
Profile at tblstat.net
Profile at tbl.org.tr

1984 births
Living people
Bornova Belediye players
Galatasaray S.K. (men's basketball) players
Hacettepe Üniversitesi B.K. players
Shooting guards
Sportspeople from Ankara
Turkish men's basketball players
Türk Telekom B.K. players